Magoma is a Bantu language of the Magoma nation in Tanzania. It is closely related to Kinga, but mutual intelligibility is low.

References

Languages of Tanzania
Northeast Bantu languages